M-map may refer to:

 Mahoney map, an extended variant of Karnaugh maps in logic optimization
 Mass Rapid Transit Master Plan in Bangkok Metropolitan Region